Sudhanshu Dhulia (born 10 August 1960) is a judge of the Supreme Court of India. He is former chief justice of the Gauhati High Court and judge of the Uttarakhand High Court.

Early life 
Dhulia was born in Lansdowne in Pauri Garhwal, Uttarakhand. His family hails from Pauri Garhwal district in Uttarakhand. He is the second son of K. C. Dhulia who was a judge of the Allahabad High Court and grandson of Bhairav Dutt Dhulia who was a freedom fighter and editor of Karmabhumi newspaper in Garhwal, Uttarakhand. Dhulia is an alumnus of Sainik School, Lucknow and Allahabad University. One of his brothers is the noted Indian film director Tigmanshu Dhulia.

Career 
Dhulia started his practice before the Allahabad High Court in 1986. As a part of the Bar, he was the legal counsel for Indian Institute of Technology (I.I.T.), Roorkee, State Industrial Development Corporation of Uttarakhand Ltd. (SIDCUL), Bhagirathi River Valley Authority, amongst others.

Dhulia became the first Chief Standing Counsel of Uttarakhand state and later appointed the State Additional Advocate General. He was designated as a Senior Advocate by the Uttarakhand High Court in 2004.

He was also an honorary professor in the Uttarakhand Academy of Administration (ATI) Nainital.

Judicial career 
Dhulia was elevated from the bar to the bench and appointed as judge of the Uttarakhand High Court on 1 November 2008. He was also appointed as the judge in-charge of education, Uttarakhand judicial and legal academy. He took oath of office of Chief Justice of Gauhati High Court on 10 January 2021 and served there until his elevation to the Supreme Court of India. He was elevated as judge of Supreme Court of India on 9 May 2022.

References 

1960 births
Living people
20th-century Indian lawyers
21st-century Indian judges
21st-century Indian lawyers
Garhwali people
Justices of the Supreme Court of India
Justices of the Uttarakhand High Court
People from Pauri
People from Uttarakhand
Sainik School alumni
University of Allahabad alumni